KMAE (106.5 FM) was an American commercial radio station licensed in 2010 to serve the community of Bruni, Texas.  The station's broadcast license was held by accordion player and Christian evangelist Paulino D. Bernal Sr. of McAllen, Texas.

KMAE served the Laredo, Texas, market, within rural Webb County, Texas, United States. Its transmitter was located in Bruni, Texas and broadcast on 106.5 FM with a power of 6 kW. The station's signal did not reach Laredo, Texas because of the presence of a pirate radio station across the border in Nuevo Laredo known as "Radio Voz 106.5", formally known as La Tremenda 106.5.

History
In May 2007, Paulino D. Bernal Sr. applied to the Federal Communications Commission (FCC) for a construction permit for a new broadcast radio station. The FCC granted this permit on July 3, 2007, with a scheduled expiration date of July 3, 2010. The new station was assigned call sign "KMAE" on June 23, 2010. After construction and testing were completed in June 2010, the station was granted its broadcast license on July 13, 2010.

The station began broadcasting under program test authority on June 29, 2010, then fell silent on July 2, 2010. In their July 16 silent notification filed with the FCC, the station cited financial reasons for the brief period of broadcasting, asserting that the station was "taken silent so that the licensee could conserve its limited financial resources." The Commission granted KMAE special temporary authority to remain silent on September 13, 2010, with a scheduled March 14, 2011, expiration date. Under the terms of the Telecommunications Act of 1996, as a matter of law a radio station's broadcast license is subject to automatic forfeiture and cancellation if they fail to broadcast for one full year. As of November 15, 2011, more than four months past that July 3 deadline, the station has yet to notify the FCC that they have resumed broadcast operations.  KMAE's license was cancelled on June 26, 2013.

Ownership
In addition to KMAE, Paulino Bernal was also the license holder for Texas radio stations KCLR, KMFM, KPBM, and KUBR. Bernal also owns 100% of the stock in KVOZ (890 AM, Del Mar Hills, Texas) license holder Consolidated Radio, Inc. Paulino Bernal Evangelism owned KAZF, KCZO, KPBB, KPBD, KPBE, KPBJ, KPMB, and KVFM in Texas plus KZPI in Deming, New Mexico.

References

External links

MAE
Radio stations established in 2010
Defunct radio stations in the United States
Radio stations disestablished in 2013
2010 establishments in Texas
2013 disestablishments in Texas
MAE